, also referred to as EMT², is a Japanese animation studio established on July 25, 2013.

List of works

Anime television series

Notes

References

External links

 

 
Animation studios in Tokyo
Japanese animation studios
Japanese companies established in 2013
Mass media companies established in 2013
Suginami